The Tall Peak Fire Tower is a historic fire tower in Ouachita National Forest.  It is located at the top of Tall Peak in the southwestern part of the national forest in Polk County, Arkansas.  It is a fieldstone structure, built about 1938 by a crew of the Civilian Conservation Corps (CCC), and features the distinctive flared corners that typify CCC architecture.  It is accessible via a forest service road off Polk County 64 (also known as Forest Service Road 38).

The tower was listed on the National Register of Historic Places in 1993.

References

Fire lookout towers on the National Register of Historic Places
Government buildings on the National Register of Historic Places in Arkansas
Towers completed in 1938
Buildings and structures in Polk County, Arkansas
Ouachita National Forest
National Register of Historic Places in Polk County, Arkansas
1938 establishments in Arkansas